George H. Jackson (28 February 1863, Natick – 19??) was an American lawyer, consul, and political activist. He was appointed treasurer at the founding meeting of the Niagara Movement.

He went to the Congo Free State in 1893 where he served as a medical missionary until 1895. 

Jackson was appointed Consul at La Rochelle, France in 1898 to 1908 and then Cognac from 1908 to 1914.

In 1919 he was appointed to the Chicago Commission on Race Relations.

References

1863 births
African-American lawyers
Year of death missing